The 1988 United States presidential election in Arkansas took place on November 8, 1988. All fifty states and the District of Columbia, were part of the 1988 United States presidential election. State voters chose six electors to the Electoral College, which selected the president and vice president.

Arkansas was won by incumbent United States Vice President George H. W. Bush of Texas, who was running against Massachusetts Governor Michael Dukakis. Bush ran with Indiana Senator Dan Quayle as Vice President, and Dukakis ran with Texas Senator Lloyd Bentsen.

Arkansas weighed in for this election as 6% more Republican than the national average. The presidential election of 1988 was a very partisan election for Arkansas, with nearly 99% of the electorate voting for either the Democratic or Republican parties. The vast majority of the counties voted primarily Republican, including the highly populated center of Pulaski County.  this stands as the last election in which Pulaski County and Crittenden County voted for a Republican presidential candidate.

In typical form for the time, the southeastern portion of the state, including counties such as Desha and Phillips continued to turn out primarily Democratic during this election. This region is part of the Mississippi Delta and of the "Black Belt" and is characterized by dark rich soils and a large, formerly slave African-American population.

Bush won the election in Arkansas with a 14-point win. Arkansas continued on in this election as a component of the conservative stronghold of the Deep South. The election results in Arkansas are reflective of a nationwide reconsolidation of the base for the Republican Party, which took place through the 1980s. Through the passage of some very controversial economic programs, spearheaded by then President Ronald Reagan (called, collectively, "Reaganomics"), the mid-to-late 1980s saw a period of economic growth and stability. The hallmark of Reaganomics was, in part, the wide-scale deregulation of corporate interests, and tax cuts for the wealthy. Dukakis ran on a socially liberal platform, and advocated for higher economic regulation and environmental protection. Bush, alternatively, ran on a campaign of continuing the social and economic policies of former President Reagan—which gained him much support with social conservatives and people living in rural areas.

Results

Results by county

See also
 United States presidential elections in Arkansas
 Presidency of George H. W. Bush

References

Arkansas
1988
1988 Arkansas elections